The heath delma (Delma hebesa) is a species of lizard in the Pygopodidae family endemic to Western Australia.

References

Pygopodids of Australia
Delma
Reptiles described in 2015
Endemic fauna of Australia